The 1959–60 season was the 12th season of competitive football in Israel and the 34th season under the Israeli Football Association, established in 1928, during the British Mandate.

Review and Events
 The national team was involved in two qualifying campaigns, for the 1960 Olympics and for the 1960 AFC Asian Cup. The team won its group in the 1960 AFC Asian Cup qualification and qualified for the main competition, held in October 1960. In the Olympic qualifications, the national team finished second on goal difference, behind the eventual competition winners, Yugoslavia.

Domestic leagues

Promotion and relegation
The following promotions and relegations took place at the end of the season:

Promoted to Liga Leumit
 Shimshon Tel Aviv

Promoted to Liga Alef
 Maccabi Sha'arayim
 Hapoel Herzliya

Promoted to Liga Bet
 Beitar Haifa
 Hapoel Yagur
 Hapoel Geva
 Hapoel Pardesiya
 Hapoel Karkur
 Hapoel HaDarom Tel Aviv
 Hapoel Zichronot
 Maccabi Holon
 Hapoel Eilat

Relegated from Liga Leumit
 Hapoel Ramat Gan

Relegated from Liga Alef
 Maccabi Rehovot
 Hapoel Netanya

Relegated from Liga Bet
 Hapoel Tirat HaCarmel
 Maccabi Tiberias
 Hapoel Even Yehuda 1
 Hapoel Beit Lid
 Hapoel Tel Mond
 Hapoel HaTzafon Jerusalem
 Hakochav Or Yehuda
 Hapoel Shmuel Be'er Sheva
 Hapoel Kiryat Malakhi

1. Hapoel Even Yehuda withdrew from the league at the end of the season and was replaced by a club from Liga Gimel.

Domestic cups

Israel State Cup
The 1958–59 Israel State Cup started during the previous season, but was carried over the summer break and finished with the final on 19 November 1959, in which Maccabi Tel Aviv defeated Hapoel Petah Tikva 4–3.

On 30 January 1960, the next season's competition began, and once again carried over to the next season.

National Teams

National team

1960 Asian Cup qualification – Western Zone

Olympic qualifications – Europe Group 4

1959–60 matches

References

 
Seasons in Israeli football